Werner Zimmermann Jr. is a Swiss retired slalom canoeist who competed from the late 1960s to the mid-1970s. He won a silver medal in the K-1 event at the 1969 ICF Canoe Slalom World Championships in Bourg St.-Maurice.

References

Swiss male canoeists
Medalists at the ICF Canoe Slalom World Championships
Living people
Year of birth missing (living people)